Little Mother may refer to:

 The Little Mother, a 1911 American silent short drama film
 Little Mother (1929 film), an Our Gang short silent comedy film
 Little Mother (1935 film), an Austrian-Hungarian comedy film
 Little Mother (1973 film), a drama, romance, cult film